Les Casablancais (English: People of Casablanca, Moroccan Arabic: Bidaoua) is a 1999 drama film directed by Abdelkader Lagtaâ. It was screened at multiple national film festivals and several international ones, including the 1999 Berlin International Film Festival.

Synopsis 
A polyphonic portrait of the city of Casablanca through the intersecting itineraries of three characters: a bookseller who receives an unexpected correspondence that forces him to question himself deeply, a young teacher whose application for a passport triggers an absurd investigation, and a teenager who, because of a misunderstanding with his fundamentalist teacher, becomes the victim of a manipulation with tragic consequences.

Cast 

 Abdelaziz Saâdallah
 Khadija Assad
 Karina Aktouf
 Salaheddine Benmoussa
 Nourredine Bikr
 Omar Sayed
 Saïda Baadi
 Mohamed Benbrahim
 Amine Kably

References

External links 
 

1999 films
Moroccan drama films
French drama films
Canadian drama films
1990s Canadian films
1990s French films